The enzyme 2-dehydro-3-deoxy-L-arabinonate dehydratase catalyzes the chemical reaction

2-dehydro-3-deoxy-L-arabinonate  2,5-dioxopentanoate + H2O

This enzyme belongs to the family of lyases, specifically the hydro-lyases, which cleave carbon-oxygen bonds.  The systematic name of this enzyme class is 2-dehydro-3-deoxy-L-arabinonate hydro-lyase (2,5-dioxopentanoate-forming). Other names in common use include 2-keto-3-deoxy-L-arabinonate dehydratase, and 2-dehydro-3-deoxy-L-arabinonate hydro-lyase.  This enzyme participates in ascorbate and aldarate metabolism.

References

 

EC 4.2.1
Enzymes of unknown structure